Teamfight Tactics (TFT) is an auto battler game developed and published by Riot Games. The game is a spinoff of League of Legends and is based on Dota Auto Chess, where players compete online against seven other opponents by building a team to be the last one standing. The game released as a League of Legends game mode for Windows and macOS in June 2019 and as a standalone game for Android and iOS in March 2020, featuring cross-platform play between them.

Gameplay
Based on Dota Auto Chess, a mod for Dota 2, the game centers around eight players who construct teams to fight one another and be the last player standing. The battlefield consists of hexagons, where players can strategically place units on the hexagons on their side of the game board between rounds. During each round, a short battle automatically commences, with two players matched randomly for that round, or else paired against computer-controlled enemies. In the rounds against computer-controlled enemies, each enemy has a chance to drop gold, units, or items that the player can use. Health lost from losing a round is calculated with a combination of set damage per round and how many units an opponent had still alive.

The game consist of stages and rounds. Each stage consist of seven rounds with the exception of stage 1. Stage 1 consist of three rounds of computer-controlled enemies. On round four of each stage, there is a feature called the "Carousel", in which players have access to a free rotation of units with random equipped items to select from. During these shared rounds, the two players with the lowest health are able to choose their units first, followed by the next two players with the lowest health, and so on. If there are players with similar health points, the game will randomly choose the order. On the last round of each stage, players will face computer-controlled enemies.

Players accumulate gold during rounds and can save it to build interest, which further increases their income per round. Players can also gain additional income per round by either winning multiple rounds in a row or losing multiple rounds in a row. With this gold, they can either reroll the five units automatically offered to them in their shop at the start of each round or purchase experience points to increase their level. The higher a player's level, the more units they can place on the board, which can also be augmented by certain items, and the higher the average rarity of units in the shop. Each unit is able to be upgraded if additional copies of the same unit are found in the shop or Shared Draft. Upgrading a champion increases their maximum health and attack damage.

With some exceptions, units have a health bar and a mana bar. Taking damage from enemy attacks or abilities will lower a unit's health but increase a unit's mana. When a unit's health reaches zero, they are effectively removed from the round. When a unit's mana bar is full, they cast a unique ability. Some units may start the round with some percentage of their mana bar full, but units generally start the round with no mana.

Synergies are activated by a team composition that makes use of one or multiple units with the same trait. Each unit has two or three traits and the effective combination of units will activate synergies that benefit the player. Synergies will usually fall into three categories: effects that strengthen allies, effects that weaken enemies, and miscellaneous effects. Each "set" of Teamfight Tactics corresponds to a unique unit pool, collection of synergies, and usable items.

Teamfight Tactics periodically updates its unit roster. Every three months there is a partial rotation, referred by Riot Games developers as a mid-set update, rotating out traits and units which are problematic. As Teamfight Tactics is a game mode of League of Legends, its patch numbering follows the same as its parent game rather than being labelled differently.

Development and release 
Teamfight Tactics was based on Dota Auto Chess, which in turn was inspired by Mahjong, where players pick up tiles and discard tiles in order to complete a hand by forming a pair and sets such as a sequence, or three or four identical tiles, while preventing other players to complete a hand. The game was released within the League of Legends client for Windows and macOS on June 26, 2019, and as a standalone app for Android and iOS on March 19, 2020. By September 2019, the game had over 33million monthly players with 1.72 billion hours of accumulated game time.

Cosmetics 
Similar to other free-to-play games from Riot, Teamfight Tactics monetization base around cosmetic consumptions. It has its own store separate from League of Legends. The player's controllable avatar, called a "Little Legend", can be customized by buying new ones from the store. Those can be upgraded by buying from loot boxes called "Little Legend eggs" or through star shards that can either be bought in the store or earned from the season pass that lasts for the duration of the set. Since the release of the Chibi Champions, Riot has been refer to these avatars as Tacticians, though the term Little Legend is still commonly used. Note, however, Tactician had been a term to refer to players before that.

Other than the controllable avatar, Teamfight Tactics also has skins for the player board where the combat between players is played. The boards can be bought directly or through bundles in the store. Boards also come with different prizes, while the cheap ones only change the model of the board, expensive ones are interactive and react to player achievement. Beside that, there is Boom, cosmetic that modify the damage particles of controllable avatar. All Booms released so far are rewards of Battle Pass.

Game modes 
Besides Normal and Ranked game modes, Riot released a faster-paced game mode  named "Hyper Roll" in April 2021, streamlining mechanics to decrease game time. Hyper roll gameplay differences include the following: Little Legends only carry 20 health and take 2 damage per fight lost for the first 4 stages, 4 damage from 5 to 7, and 8 damage from anything beyond, 75% increased movement speed, and the carousel is not part of the game. In early 2022, Riot made Double Up as a new game mode.

Sets 
Teamfight Tactics is being supported by Riot Games post-launch, with regular balance updates to keep the game fair and entertaining, as well as Little Legend egg drops. The game also updates the game in a big way with "sets". Sets give players more incentive to play the game, changing synergies and introducing new ones, rotating various League of Legends champions into the roster, as well as dropping new season passes.

References

External links 
 

Android (operating system) games
Auto battler video games
Esports games
Free-to-play video games
IOS games
2019 video games
MacOS games
Video games developed in the United States
Windows games
League of Legends
Riot Games games